The Mashpee Woodland Revolt or Mashpee Revolt was a non-violent, 1833–1834 uprising of the Mashpee people against white inhabitants in New England. A group of the Mashpee Wampanoags traveled to Boston to seek justice for settler encroachments. William Apess was one of their leaders.

Background

References

Further reading

1833 in Massachusetts
1834 in Massachusetts
Conflicts in 1833
Conflicts in 1834
19th-century rebellions
Native American history of Massachusetts
Indigenous rights protests
Rebellions against the United States